Plymouth Whitemarsh High School is a public high school in Plymouth Meeting, Pennsylvania, US. It is part of the Colonial School District.

Plymouth Whitemarsh is a public high school in the Philadelphia region, and is accredited by the Middle States Association of Colleges and Schools. The curriculum is aligned with state and national standards and offers more than 200 courses, including 24 Advanced Placement (AP) courses audited by the College Board and more than 30 honors level courses. A technical education program is available through the Central Montco Technical High School.

Sports and traditions 
Boys' Basketball: Six District 1 championships and three state titles (1963, 1997 and 2010). PIAA AAAA players of the year: C.J. Aiken (2010) and Jaylen Bond (2011).
Girls' Basketball: 2017 Suburban One American champion (22-0 regular season, 14-0 conference), 2018 SOL American champion. 1985 PIAA AAAA state runner-up. 1983 District 1 AAA champions. 2022 Undefeated PIAA AAAAAA State Champions (perfect 34-0 season) 
Golf: PW won Suburban One American titles in 2007, 2008, and 2009.
Boys' tennis: League championships in 2008 and 2009.
Girls' tennis: Christina Keiser District 1 AAA champion in 2011, 2012 and 2013 and PIAA AAA state champion in 2012.
Football: Suburban One American champions in 2005, 2011, 2012, 2013, and 2016. In the 1990s Plymouth Whitemarsh Football placed 8th in winning percentage in the state of Pennsylvania out of 563 High Schools with a record of 94-20-2, including seven league championships. In the early 1970s, the Colonials had a 33-game unbeaten streak.
Bowling:  2006 Suburban One individual champion Chris Lawler. 2007 Suburban One individual champion Kevin Rexroth. 2010 Suburban One Continental/American boys co-champions with Norristown. Chris Hammes in 2008 and Julius Selfinger in 2012 bowled perfect games. PW's bowling program began in 2004.
Baseball: 1994 State Champions, ranked 6th best high school baseball team in the country in USA Today. SOL American champions in 2019.
Boys' lacrosse: 2011 marked the Colonials' first Suburban One American Boys Lacrosse title in PW history, playing to an undefeated 12-0 league campaign. Also won the 2012 Suburban One American title with a 12-0 league campaign, plus the Colonials earned their first District 1 playoff victory in 2012. Playoff appearances: 2009, 2010, 2011, 2012, 2013, 2014, 2015, 2016.
Girls' lacrosse: League champions in 2004, 2016, 2018.
Field Hockey: Suburban One American champions in 2013, 2014, 2015, 2016, 2017, 2018, 2019. 
Softball:  2008 Suburban One American quad-champions with Methacton, Upper Merion, and Cheltenham. PW recorded lone playoff victory in 2009. District 1 AAAA appearances: 2008 (first round), 2009 (first and second rounds), 2011 (first round), and 2016 (first round). Dana Moyer has coached the Lady Colonials since spring 2011.
Cheerleading: Numerous first place wins each year as well as bids to National competitions in Florida, Virginia, and Pittsburgh.
Ice hockey:2008-2009 SHSHL A Champions, 2019-2020 SHSHL A Champions. 13 Flyers Cup Appearances have been made by the team, with recent success making the tournament 5 seasons in a row dating from 2018-2019 to 2022-2023. 
Boys' soccer: Suburban One Liberty Boys Soccer champions in 1985. Suburban One American champions in 2013 with a 13-l league mark sharing with Upper Dublin, earning the eighth seed in the District One AAA tournament advancing to the second round (lost 1-0 to visiting nine Bensalem) after its first-ever District One playoff victory (1-0 home victory against visiting 25 Harriton in first round). Suburban One American champions 2014 with a 13-1 league record, earning the fifth place seed in the District One AAA tournament advancing to the quarterfinals (lost 2-1 to Central Bucks East in overtime). Also advanced to second round of districts in 2015 and 2017.
Girls' soccer: Suburban One American champion in 2011 and 2014. PIAA District 1 AAA playoff appearances in 2010 (round one loss), 2011 (round one loss), 2013 (round one loss), and 2014 (won first-round game, lost second round). District 1 AAAA playoff appearances in 2017 (round one loss) and 2019 (round one win, round two loss).
Girls' volleyball: District 1 AAAA runner-up and PIAA AAAA state quarterfinalist in 2016. Suburban One Continental/American champion in 2016  2017, 2018; also won conference titles in 1983, 1984, 1985, 1986, 1987, 1988, 1989, and 1999. District 1 champion in 1984.
CG (Casual Gamers) Esports: The semi-professional E-sports team founded in summer of 2018 by Pro Forknife player wanna-be, ΣακεΨουρΔαψ. If Ultimate Frisbee can be a sport, so can this.
Wrestling: Justin Giovinco captured the PIAA AAA state championship in 1998 and 1999 at the 140 lbs. and 145 lbs. weight classes. Giovinco finished his career with a 144-8 record and went on to wrestle at the University of Pittsburgh. John Michael Staudenmayer won the PIAA, AAA state championship in 2011 at the 171 lbs. weight class. Staudenmayer finished his career with a 168-11 record and went on to wrestle at the University of North Carolina. Long-time coach Bob Lorence retired in 2008 and finished with a 357-180-6 career coaching record. Lorence was inducted into the Southeast Pennsylvania Hall of Fame in 2002 and the PIAA Wrestling Hall of Fame in 2006.
Marching Band: In November 2013, the Plymouth Whitemarsh Marching Colonials won a state championship against 11 other highly competitive marching bands in the American Division with a score of 97.05. The band also took home awards for High Visual, High Ensemble Music, High Auxiliary, General Effect, and Highest Score of the night.

Colonial Players 
The Colonial Players are an extra curricular theatre program founded in 1977 that strives to produce professional-quality musicals and plays. They serve primarily to enhance live theatre performances in the local community and to give students an opportunity to express themselves. The musical production's earn critic acclaim by the Greater Philadelphia Cappies, a high school theatre awards program, and took home their first Cappie award in 2006 in Props and Effects for the design of an oversized piano in Big, The Musical. In 2009, the Colonial Players earned 13 Cappie nominations for their production of Little Shop of Horrors, "Best Show" being among them. The Colonial Players' production of How to Succeed in Business Without Really Trying was nominated for 16 Cappie Awards, the most of any school participating in the Greater Philadelphia Cappies. In the 2012–2013 season, the Colonial Players put on Father of the Bride and Guys and Dolls, which was well revered by the high school Cappie reviewers.

Notable alumni 

 Beth Anders, All-American in Field Hockey and Lacrosse, Olympic Field Hockey Captain, 1984 bronze medalist, 9 time NCAA champion as coach of Old Dominion.
 Owen Biddle, Grammy-winning member of  The Roots, from 2007–2011. Performer on Late Night With Jimmy Fallon (with The Roots as house band) as Fallon's fictional wife, Renee, who is an alcoholic on "The Real Housewives of Late Night".
 Craig Borten, screenwriter of the 2013 film Dallas Buyers Club, for which he was nominated for a screenwriting Oscar.
 Joe Daley, professional golfer formerly of the PGA Tour and Nationwide Tour. He now plays on the Champions Tour. On July 1, 2012, Daley won the Senior Players Championship for his first major victory on the Champions Tour.  Class of 1978. 
 Jackie Frazier-Lyde, attorney and boxer (daughter of Joe Frazier), who fought Laila Ali, daughter of Muhammad Ali.
 Marvis Frazier – boxer (son of Joe Frazier).
 Neil Gershenfeld, professor at the Massachusetts Institute of Technology, head of MIT's Center for Bits and Atoms.
Curtis King, former pitcher for the St. Louis Cardinals.
 James Martin (Jesuit writer), Jesuit priest and author, frequent commentator on Roman Catholic news for The New York Times, Time, Newsweek, ABC, NBC, FoxNews, CNN and NPR.
Tom Mitchell, former professional football player Bucknell, Baltimore Colts
 John Pergine, former professional football player, University of Notre Dame, Washington Redskins.
 John Salmons, former professional basketball player, last played for the NBA's New Orleans Pelicans.

 Steve Schlachter (born 1954), American-Israeli basketball player in the Israeli Basketball Premier League
 Da'Rel Scott, former running back for the New York Giants, former running back for the Maryland Terrapins.

References 

https://www.phillyvoice.com/police-investigate-possible-sext-sharing-scandal-plymouth-whitemarsh-high-school/

External links 
 
 Colonial School District

Public high schools in Pennsylvania
Schools in Montgomery County, Pennsylvania
International Baccalaureate schools in Pennsylvania